Net Worth is a 1995 Canadian biographical drama television film directed by Jerry Ciccoritti, based on the 1991 book Net Worth: Exploding the Myths of Pro Hockey by journalists David Cruise and Alison Griffiths. Starring Aidan Devine, Kevin Conway, R. H. Thomson, and Al Waxman, the film premiered on CBC on November 26, 1995.

Premise

Based on the true story of the Detroit Red Wings' Ted Lindsay, a nine-time NHL All-Star who, along with Doug Harvey of the Montreal Canadiens, headed up a small group of players in a battle to protect the rights of players against monopolistic NHL owners of the 1950s era, including Bruce Norris of the Red Wings, Conn Smythe of the Toronto Maple Leafs, and James D. Norris of the Chicago Black Hawks as well as NHL president, Clarence Campbell.  The film focuses on the conflict between Lindsay and Jack Adams, Detroit's general manager, as well as Lindsay's struggle to win over the trust and support of the players, including Lindsay's long-time teammate, the legendary Gordie Howe, amidst coercion and threats from the league and the owners. Lindsay's efforts would ultimately result in the formation of the NHL Players Association.

Cast
 Aidan Devine as Ted Lindsay
 Kevin Conway as Gordie Howe
 R. H. Thomson as Milton Mound
 Al Waxman as Jack Adams
 Scott Speedman as Rookie

Awards and honors

Gemini Awards
The film won four Gemini Awards presented by the Academy of Canadian Cinema and Television and was nominated in a further four categories.

Won
 Gemini Award (1997) for Best Direction in a Dramatic Program (Jerry Ciccoritti)
 Gemini Award (1997) for Best Performance by an Actor in a Featured Supporting Role in a Dramatic Program (Al Waxman)
 Gemini Award (1997) for Best Performance by an Actor in a Leading Role in a Dramatic Program (Aidan Devine)
 Gemini Award (1997) for Best TV Movie (Bernard Zuckerman)

Nominated
 Gemini Award (1997) for Best Costume Design (Tulla Nixon)
 Gemini Award (1997) for Best Performance by an Actor in a Featured Supporting Role in a Dramatic Program (Carl Marotte)
 Gemini Award (1997) for Best Picture Editing in a Dramatic Program or Series (George Roulston)
 Gemini Award (1997) for Best Production Design or Art Direction (Arthur Harriot)

References

External links
 

1995 television films
1995 films
1995 drama films
1990s biographical drama films
1990s sports drama films
Biographical television films
Canadian biographical drama films
English-language Canadian films
Canadian ice hockey films
Canadian sports drama films
CBC Television original films
Canadian drama television films
Films directed by Jerry Ciccoritti
Films set in the 1950s
Gemini and Canadian Screen Award for Best Television Film or Miniseries winners
Sports films based on actual events
Sports television films
1990s Canadian films